was a feudal domain under the Tokugawa shogunate of Edo period Japan, in what is now eastern Ehime Prefecture on the island of Shikoku. It was centered around Imabari Castle in what is now the city of Imabari, Ehime, and was ruled throughout most of its history by a cadet branch of the Hisamatsu-Matsudaira clan. Imabari Domain was dissolved in the abolition of the han system in 1871 and is now part of Ehime Prefecture.

History
In 1600, Tōdō Takatora, daimyō of Uwajima Domain received an increase in kokudaka to 200,000 koku for his services in the Battle of Sekigahara and relocated his seat to Kokubunyama Castle in Imabari and established Imabari Domain. However, since Kokubunyama Castle is a medieval mountain castle, it was an inconvenient location to build a castle town, so in 1602, construction of a modern castle was started, and Imabari Castle was completed a year later. In 1608, he was transferred to Tsu Domain with control over the two provinces of Ise and Iga, leaving is adopted son Tōdō Takayoshi as lord of a 20,000 koku remnant of the domain centered at Imabari Castle. Tōdō Takayoshi was transferred to Nabari in Iga Province in 1635.  In the same year, the Tokugawa shogunate transferred Matsudaira Sadayuki form Kuwana Domain to Iyo-Matsuyama Domain, and raised his younger brother Matsudaira Sadafusa from 7,000 koku at Ise Nagashima Castle to 30,000 koku as daimyō of Imabari.   In 1665, Sadafusa was appointed to the position of castellan of Edo Castle, for which he received an additional 10,000 koku from Musashi, Shimōsa, and Hitachi Provinces as a his stipend, raising his total to 40,000 koku.

Sadatoki left 5000 koku in the Kantō region in his will to his younger brother, reducing the kokudaka of Imabari Domain to 35,000 koku. In 1698, 5,000 koku of land in Kantō was exchanged for 5,000 koku in Uma District. The industries that supported the clan's finances include salt, cotton, and sweet potatoes as domain monopolies. In 1805, the 7th daimyō, Matsudaira Sadayoshi, set up "Kōshoba", the predecessor of the han school. In 1807, the "Kōshoba" was expanded and changed its name to "Katsumeikan".

In 1863, during the Bakumatsu period, the 10th daimyō, Matsudaira Sadanori, reformed the domain military with Western style firearms and built an artillery battery on the coast. He also tried to a mediate between the shogunate and the Sonnō jōi loyalists, and stayed in Kyoto for a long time. During the Second Chōshū expedition in 1865, he determined the situation of the shogunate was hopeless, and decided to side with to the Imperial Court. In the Battle of Toba-Fushimi in 1868, he quickly sent troops to Kyoto and guarded the Kyoto Imperial Palace. In the subsequent battles of the Boshin War, the clan served with the Meiji government army. This was a very different stance from Iyo-Matsuyama Domain, which continued its support of the shogunate.

In 1868, Matsudaira Sadanori renounced the Matsudaira name and styled himself "Hisamatsu Sadanori". In 1871, Imabari Domain became "Imabari Prefecture" due to the abolition of the han system and establishment of prefectures. After that, it was incorporated into Ehime Prefecture via Matsuyama Prefecture and Sekitetsu Prefecture. In 1884, Hisamatsu Sadnori became a viscount in the kazoku peerage.

Holdings at the end of the Edo period
As with most domains in the han system, Imabari Domain consisted of several discontinuous territories calculated to provide the assigned kokudaka, based on periodic cadastral surveys and projected agricultural yields. 

Iyo Province  
19 villages in Uma District
81 villages in Ochi District

List of daimyō 

{| class=wikitable
! #||Name || Tenure || Courtesy title || Court Rank || kokudaka 
|-
|colspan=6|  Tōdō clan, 1600 -1608 (Tozama)
|-
||1||||1600 - 1608||Sakon-e-no-shōshō (左近衛権少将), Sado-no-kami (佐渡守)|| Junior 4th Rank, Lower Grade (従四位下)||200,000 koku 
|-
|colspan=6|  tenryō　1608-1635
|-
|colspan=6|  Hisamatsu-Matsudaira clan, 1635 -1871 (Fudai)
|-
||1||||1635 - 1674||Mimasaku-no-kami (美作守); Jijū (侍従)|| Junior 4th Rank, Lower Grade (従四位下)||30,000->40,000 koku 
|-
||2||||1674 - 1676||Mimasaku-no-kami (美作守)|| Junior 5th Rank, Lower Grade (従五位下)||40,000 koku 
|-
||3||||1676 - 1702||Suruga-no-kami (駿河守)|| Junior 5th Rank, Lower Grade (従五位下)||35,000 koku 
|-
|4||||1702 - 1732||Mimasaku-no-kami (美作守)|| Junior 5th Rank, Lower Grade (従五位下)||35,000 koku 
|-
||5||||1732 - 1763||Chikugo-no-kami (筑後守)|| Junior 5th Rank, Lower Grade (従五位下)||35,000 koku 
|-
||6||||1763 - 1790||Naizen-no-kami (内膳正)|| Junior 5th Rank, Lower Grade (従五位下)||35,000 koku 
|-
||7||||1790 - 1824||Iki-no-kami (壱岐守)|| Junior 5th Rank, Lower Grade (従五位下)||35,000 koku 
|-
||8||||1824 - 1837||Wakasa-no-kami (若狭守)|| Junior 5th Rank, Lower Grade (従五位下)||35,000 koku 
|-
||9||||1837 - 1862||Wakasa-no-kami (若狭守)|| Junior 5th Rank, Lower Grade (従五位下)||35,000 koku 
|-
||10||||1862 - 1871||Iki-no-kami (壱岐守)|| Junior 5th Rank, Lower Grade (従五位下)||35,000 koku 
|-
|-
|}

See also
 List of Han
 Abolition of the han system

References 

Domains of Japan
History of Ehime Prefecture
Iyo Province
Shikoku region
Matsudaira clan
1600 establishments in Japan
States and territories established in 1600
1871 disestablishments in Japan
States and territories disestablished in 1871